Iracema is a 1917 Brazilian silent historical film directed by Vittorio Capellaro and starring Iracema de Alencar in the title role. The film is an adaptation of José de Alencar's 1865 novel of the same title. The story is set during the early contacts between European and Native Americans in what became Brazil. It was remade in 1949.

Cast
 Iracema de Alencar as Iracema
 Vittorio Capellaro 
 Georgina N. Cappelaro 
 Ernesto Crehneras 
 Alvaro Fonseca 
 Leonel Simi

References

Bibliography
 Johnson, Randal & Stam, Robert. Brazilian Cinema. Columbia University Press, 1995,

External links

1910s historical drama films
1917 films
Brazilian silent films
Brazilian historical drama films
Films based on Brazilian novels
Films set in the 16th century
1910s Portuguese-language films
Brazilian black-and-white films
1917 drama films
Silent historical drama films